Carvill or McCarvill or MacCarvill is an Irish surname that may refer to the following people:

Carvill
Henry Carvill Lewis (1853–1888), American geologist and mineralogist
Michael Carvill (born 1988), Northern Irish footballer 
Patrick Carvill (1839–1924), Irish politician

Mc/MacCarill
Patrick MacCarvill (1893–1955), Irish politician
Chris McCarvill (born 1971), American musician

See also
Mac Cearbhaill, a Gaelic Irish clan